Adrian Dawid Benedyczak (born 24 November 2000) is a Polish professional footballer who plays as a forward for Serie B club Parma.

Club career

On 27 June 2021, Benedyczak joined Serie B side Parma on a four-year deal.

References

External links

2000 births
People from Kamień Pomorski
Sportspeople from West Pomeranian Voivodeship
Living people
Polish footballers
Poland youth international footballers
Poland under-21 international footballers
Association football forwards
Pogoń Szczecin players
Chrobry Głogów players
Parma Calcio 1913 players
Ekstraklasa players
I liga players
III liga players
Serie B players
Polish expatriate footballers
Expatriate footballers in Italy
Polish expatriate sportspeople in Italy